George Brown may refer to:

Arts and entertainment
 George Loring Brown (1814–1889), American landscape painter
 George Douglas Brown (1869–1902), Scottish novelist
 George Williams Brown (1894–1963), Canadian historian and editor
 George D. Brown (architect), American architect
 George H. Brown (producer) (1913–2001), British film producer
 George Mackay Brown (1921–1996), Scottish poet, author, and dramatist
 George Brown (medievalist) (died 2021), American scholar of Anglo-Saxon literature
 George Brown (musician) (born 1949), American drummer for Kool & the Gang

Business and industry
 George Edwards Brown (1780–1848), British-born Chilean businessman and politician
 George Brown (financier) (1787–1859), American banker and railroad founder
 George W. Brown (businessman) (1845–1918), American founder of the Brown's Business College chain
 George A. Brown (1885–1940), Scottish businessman, manager of the Rangoon Times
 George R. Brown (1898–1983), American construction entrepreneur
 George Garvin Brown IV (born 1969/70), Canadian businessman

Law
 George H. Brown (North Carolina judge) (1850–1926), associate justice of the North Carolina Supreme Court
 George M. Brown (judge) (1864–1934), American attorney and judge in Oregon
 George Stewart Brown (1871–1941), judge for the United States Customs Court
 George H. Brown Jr. (Tennessee judge) (born 1939), associate justice of the Tennessee Supreme Court
 Sir George Brown (Belizean judge) (1942–2007), Chief Justice of Belize from 1990 to 1998

Military
 Sir George Brown (British Army officer) (1790–1865), British general in the Crimean War
 George Brown (admiral) (1835–1913), American admiral
 George Scratchley Brown (1918–1978), Chief of Staff of the U.S. Air Force, Chairman of the Joint Chiefs of Staff

Politics and government

Canada
 George Brown (Canadian politician) (1818–1880), Scottish-born journalist and politician
 George Stayley Brown (1827–1915), ship owner, historian and political figure in Nova Scotia
 George W. Brown (Saskatchewan politician) (1860–1919), Lieutenant Governor of Saskatchewan
 George Brown (Ottawa politician) (born 1959), Ottawa politician

United Kingdom
 George Brown (Governor of Bombay) (fl. 1811–1812), Governor of Bombay
 George Francis Brown (1802–1871), civil servant of the East India Company
 George Mackenzie Brown (1869–1946), Member of Parliament
 George Brown, Baron George-Brown (1914–1985), Secretary of State for Foreign Affairs

United States
 George Brown (Rhode Island politician) (1746–1836), lieutenant governor of Rhode Island
 George Houston Brown (1810–1865), New Jersey politician
 George William Brown (mayor) (1812–1890), mayor of Baltimore, Maryland
 George W. Brown (Wisconsin politician) (c. 1819–?), Wisconsin legislator from Waukesha County
 George Brown (Wisconsin politician, born 1830) (1830–1909), English-born Wisconsin politician
 George H. Brown (Lowell mayor) (1877–1950), mayor of Lowell, Massachusetts
 George Brown Jr. (1920–1999), U.S. Representative from California
 George L. Brown (politician) (1926–2006), Colorado politician
 Hank Brown (George Hanks Brown, born 1940), U.S. Senator from Colorado

Other countries
 George Brown (South African politician) (1870–1932), Scottish-born South African trade unionist and politician
 George Deas Brown (1922–2014), Australian politician
 George Brown (Australian politician, born 1929) (1929–2002), Australian politician and Lord Mayor of Darwin, Northern Territory

Religion
 George Brown (bishop of Dunkeld) (c. 1438–1515), Scottish bishop
 George Brown (Benedictine) (died 1628), English Benedictine
 George Brown (bishop of Liverpool) (1784–1856), English Roman Catholic Bishop of Liverpool
 George Brown (missionary) (1835–1917), English Methodist missionary to Fiji, Samoa, and New Britain, president-general of the Methodist Church of Australasia

Science and medicine
 George Brown (inventor) (1650–1730), Scottish inventor
 Sir George Lindor Brown (1903–1971), English physiologist and Secretary of the Royal Society
 George Harold Brown (1908–1987), American developer of color television
 George W. Brown (computer scientist) (1917–2005), American statistician, game theorist, and computer scientist
 G. Spencer-Brown (1923–2016), English mathematician
 Sir George Malcolm Brown (1925–1997), English geologist
 George Brown (sociologist) (born 1930), English medical sociologist

Sports

American football
 George Brown (coach) (fl. 1953), American football coach
 George Brown (American football) (1923–2008), American football player
 George Brown (gridiron football) (1923–2013), American and Canadian football player

Association football (soccer)
 George H. Brown (footballer) (1866–1903), English footballer, Notts County
 George Brown (footballer, born 1880), English footballer, Stoke,	Norwich City, Millwall, Sheffield United
 George Brown (footballer, born 1883), English footballer, Southampton 
 George Brown (footballer, born 1903) (1903–1948), English footballer, Huddersfield, Aston Villa, Burnley, Leeds United
 George Brown (footballer, born 1907) (1907–1988), Scottish international footballer, Rangers	
 George Brown (Australian soccer) (fl. 1920s), Australian international soccer player, Brisbane City, Pineapple Rovers
 George Brown (footballer, born 1928) (1928–2011), Scottish footballer, Stenhousemuir, Hamilton Academical
 George Brown (soccer, born 1935), American soccer player, New York Americans, Elizabeth Falcons
 George Brown (footballer, born 1999), Indonesian footballer

Baseball
 George Brown (1910s outfielder) (1885–1955), American Negro leagues baseball outfielder
 George Brown (pitcher) (fl. 1920s), American Negro leagues baseball pitcher
 George Brown (1940s outfielder) (fl. 1940s), American Negro leagues baseball outfielder

Cricket
 George Brown (cricketer, born 1783) (1783–1857), English cricketer
 George Brown (cricketer, born 1821) (1821–1875), English cricketer
 George Brown (cricketer, born 1887) (1887–1964), English cricketer

Other sports
 George Daniel Brown (1836–1902), English golfer
 George Brown (rower) (1839–1875), Canadian champion single scull rower
 George V. Brown (1880–1937), American sports official and coach
 George Knockout Brown (1890–?), American welterweight boxer
 George Brown (ice hockey) (1912–1972), Canadian ice hockey player
 George Brown (motorcyclist) (1912–1979), English motorcycle racer
 George Brown (sailor) (1915–1995), British Olympic sailor
 George Brown (rugby league, Batley) (fl. 1940s), English rugby league footballer for England and Batley
 George Brown (long jumper) (1931–2018), American long jumper
 George Brown (basketball) (1935–2016), American basketball player
 George Brown (rugby league, Castleford) (fl. 1950s–1960s), English rugby league footballer for Castleford
 George Brown (Australian footballer) (born 1959), Australian rules footballer

Trade unions
 George William Brown (trade unionist) (1880–?), British trade unionist and politician
 George Brown (American trade unionist) (fl. 1922–1943), American president of the International Alliance of Theatrical Stage Employees
 George Brown (communist) (1906–1937), Irish-born Manchester trade unionist killed in the Spanish Civil War

Other people 
 Sir George McLaren Brown (1865–1939), Canadian railway administrator
 George Brown (executioner) (fl. 1911–1919), English executioner
 Igor Gouzenko (alias George Brown, 1919–1982), Soviet defector to Canada

Other uses 
 George Brown College, applied arts and technology college in Toronto, Ontario, Canada
 George Brown, Class Clown, a book series by author Nancy E. Krulik
 George Brown Darwin Botanic Gardens, located in Darwin, Northern Territory, Australia

See also
 Georg Stanford Brown (born 1943), Cuban-American actor and director
 George Browne (disambiguation)
 George Broun (disambiguation)
 Brown George, a Jamaican dessert